The 1968–69 NBA season was the Lakers' 21st season in the NBA and ninth season in Los Angeles. This season saw the Lakers acquire Wilt Chamberlain from the Philadelphia 76ers in a trade that sent Jerry Chambers, Archie Clark, and Darrall Imhoff to the 76ers.

The Lakers would make it to the NBA Finals, but would lose to the Boston Celtics in seven games despite being the heavy favorites. This marked the Lakers' seventh consecutive defeat to the Celtics in the NBA Finals.

Jerry West, who averaged nearly 38 points per game in the Finals, became the inaugural recipient of the Finals Most Valuable Player award. To date he is the only player in NBA history to win the award as a member of the losing team.

Offseason

Draft picks

Roster

Regular season

Season standings

Record vs. opponents

Game log

Playoffs

|- align="center" bgcolor="#ffcccc"
| 1
| March 26
| San Francisco
| L 94–99
| Jerry West (36)
| Wilt Chamberlain (30)
| Jerry West (7)
| The Forum10,697
| 0–1
|- align="center" bgcolor="#ffcccc"
| 2
| March 28
| San Francisco
| L 101–107
| Jerry West (36)
| Wilt Chamberlain (17)
| Jerry West (11)
| The Forum15,119
| 0–2
|- align="center" bgcolor="#ccffcc"
| 3
| March 31
| @ San Francisco
| W 115–98
| Jerry West (25)
| Wilt Chamberlain (28)
| Jerry West (9)
| Oakland–Alameda County Coliseum Arena13,221
| 1–2
|- align="center" bgcolor="#ccffcc"
| 4
| April 2
| @ San Francisco
| W 103–88
| Jerry West (36)
| Wilt Chamberlain (14)
| Jerry West (5)
| Cow Palace14,812
| 2–2
|- align="center" bgcolor="#ccffcc"
| 5
| April 4
| San Francisco
| W 103–98
| Jerry West (29)
| Wilt Chamberlain (27)
| Jerry West (13)
| The Forum17,309
| 3–2
|- align="center" bgcolor="#ccffcc"
| 6
| April 5
| @ San Francisco
| W 118–78
| Jerry West (29)
| Wilt Chamberlain (25)
| Jerry West (8)
| Cow Palace8,924
| 4–2
|-

|- align="center" bgcolor="#ccffcc"
| 1
| April 11
| @ Atlanta
| W 95–93
| Jerry West (25)
| Wilt Chamberlain (29)
| Baylor, Egan (6)
| The Forum16,190
| 1–0
|- align="center" bgcolor="#ccffcc"
| 2
| April 13
| Atlanta
| W 104–102
| Wilt Chamberlain (23)
| Wilt Chamberlain (29)
| Johnny Egan (11)
| The Forum15,136
| 2–0
|- align="center" bgcolor="#ffcccc"
| 3
| April 15
| @ Atlanta
| L 86–99
| Johnny Egan (19)
| Wilt Chamberlain (22)
| West, Baylor (4)
| Alexander Memorial Coliseum7,140
| 2–1
|- align="center" bgcolor="#ccffcc"
| 4
| April 17
| @ Atlanta
| W 100–85
| Wilt Chamberlain (25)
| Wilt Chamberlain (19)
| Jerry West (5)
| Alexander Memorial Coliseum7,140
| 3–1
|- align="center" bgcolor="#ccffcc"
| 5
| April 20
| Atlanta
| W 104–96
| Elgin Baylor (29)
| Wilt Chamberlain (29)
| Elgin Baylor (12)
| The Forum16,273
| 4–1
|-

|- align="center" bgcolor="#ccffcc"
| 1
| April 23
| Boston
| W 120–118
| Jerry West (53)
| Wilt Chamberlain (23)
| Jerry West (10)
| The Forum17,554
| 1–0
|- align="center" bgcolor="#ccffcc"
| 2
| April 25
| Boston
| W 118–112
| Jerry West (41)
| Wilt Chamberlain (19)
| Egan, West (8)
| The Forum17,559
| 2–0
|- align="center" bgcolor="#ffcccc"
| 3
| April 27
| @ Boston
| L 105–111
| Jerry West (24)
| Wilt Chamberlain (26)
| Jerry West (6)
| Boston Garden14,037
| 2–1
|- align="center" bgcolor="#ffcccc"
| 4
| April 29
| @ Boston
| L 88–89
| Jerry West (40)
| Wilt Chamberlain (31)
| West, Baylor (4)
| Boston Garden15,128
| 2–2
|- align="center" bgcolor="#ccffcc"
| 5
| May 1
| Boston
| W 117–104
| Jerry West (39)
| Wilt Chamberlain (31)
| Jerry West (9)
| The Forum17,553
| 3–2
|- align="center" bgcolor="#ffcccc"
| 6
| May 3
| @ Boston
| L 90–99
| West, Baylor (26)
| Wilt Chamberlain (18)
| Wilt Chamberlain (4)
| Boston Garden15,128
| 3–3
|- align="center" bgcolor="#ffcccc"
| 7
| May 5
| Boston
| L 106–108
| Jerry West (42)
| Wilt Chamberlain (27)
| Jerry West (12)
| The Forum17,568
| 3–4
|-

Awards
 Jerry West, NBA Finals Most Valuable Player Award
 Elgin Baylor, All-NBA First Team
 Jerry West, All-NBA Second Team
 Jerry West, NBA All-Defensive Second Team
 Elgin Baylor, NBA All-Star Game
 Jerry West, NBA All-Star Game
 Wilt Chamberlain, NBA All-Star Game
 Bill Hewitt, NBA All-Rookie Team 1st Team

References

Los Angeles Lakers
Los Angeles Lakers seasons
Los Angle